The Chinese Elm cultivar Ulmus parvifolia 'Ed Wood' is intended for bonsai, or even model train set landscaping. It is however reputedly hardy to −23 °C (−10 °F).

Description
A miniature variety , described as forming a canopy of tiny leaves.

Pests and diseases
The species and its cultivars are highly resistant, but not immune, to Dutch elm disease, and unaffected by the Elm Leaf Beetle Xanthogaleruca luteola.

Cultivation
'Ed Wood' is not known to be in cultivation beyond North America.

References

Chinese elm cultivar
Ulmus articles missing images
Ulmus